Tom Weyer (29 August 1962 – 9 June 2022), better known by his stage name Commander Tom, was a German DJ and record producer.

Career
He began working as a DJ at the "Drops SuperDisco" in Kehl, Baden-Württemberg, in the 1980s, and also worked as a DJ at the "Rheinpark" discothèque in Germersheim, Rhineland-Palatinate, in the 1990s. 

In 2004, his single "Attention!", sampled from the Tom Novy vs. Eniac 1997 song "Superstar", hit #1 on the German dance music charts. It peaked at #23 in the UK Singles Chart in February 2005. A further single, "I Can't Sleep!", was released in 2006.

Commander Tom died on 9 June 2022, at the age of 59.

References

External links
 

1962 births
2022 deaths
German house musicians
German trance musicians